Bogoslovka is a rural locality (a selo) in Andreyevsky Selsoviet of Ivanovsky District, Amur Oblast, Russia. The population was 49 as of 2018. There are 2 streets.

Geography 
Bogoslovka is located on the left bank of the Manchzhurka River, 14 km southeast of Ivanovka (the district's administrative centre) by road. Pravovostochnoye is the nearest rural locality.

References 

Rural localities in Ivanovsky District, Amur Oblast